Linrong Shin Kong railway station is a railway station on the Taitung line operated by the Taiwan Railways Administration. The station is located in Fenglin Township, Hualien County, Taiwan, on the southern end of the Xikou Tunnel, which crosses the Shoufeng River. It is the only underground station on the Taitung line.

The station name is a combination of Linrong, a village located nearby, and the Shin Kong Group, who owns the land around the station and financed its construction. The station is located at the entrance of Harvest Ranch and Resort, which is owned by Shin Kong.

History 
The original Japanese-era Taitung line, built in a  gauge, crossed the Shoufeng River on a bridge to the east of the current tracks. On 1 November 1918, a station named Pinglin station (平林停車場) was built on the south bank of the river. In 1962, the station was renamed to Linrong station after the village it was located in.

Beginning in the 1980s, the Taitung line was rebuilt with a  gauge. During this process, a straighter route was chosen for the tracks via the Xikou Tunnel underneath the Shoufeng River, and Linrong station closed in 1982 with the opening year of the tunnel. The former station building was removed in 1988, and a park stands at its former site.

In 2011, during the planning phase of the electrification of the Taitung line, local residents and the Shin Kong Group petitioned for a new station to be built in Linrong. Locals wanted a station to replace Xikou Station, a station on the north of the river that was slated to be closed for low ridership; Shin Kong wanted a station to bring in more tourists to the Harvest Ranch and Resort. Xikou Tunnel was rebuilt in 2013, and the construction allocated space for a new station. However, groundbreaking for the station was delayed until 7 December 2015 due to issues with acquiring a building permit. The station was opened on 10 July 2018.

Services 
Despite being classified as a "simple station", the fifth tier, Linrong Shin Kong is served by four Puyuma Express services as well as the Chu-Kuang Express trains 1 and 2, which are excursion trains. Local trains before 8:00 AM and after 3:30 PM do not call at the station.

Notes

References

1918 establishments in Taiwan
Railway stations in Hualien County
Railway stations opened in 1918
Railway stations served by Taiwan Railways Administration